Liliane Ferrarezi (born June 26, 1988) is a Brazilian model. In 2002, she was the winner out of 350,000 entrants competing in the Brazilian round of the Supermodel of the World contest. Representing Brazil in the 2002 world final, held in Punta Cana, Dominican Republic, she finished as the runner-up out of forty-five contestants.

Since then, she has modelled for designer labels including Balenciaga, Calvin Klein, and Marc Jacobs and been photographed for the campaigns of Burberry and Gap. Her magazine covers include French and Italian editions of Vogue. She also appeared in a television commercial for "Echo Women" by Davidoff.

Ferrarezi has worked for the agencies Beatrice of Milan, Ford Models of Sao Paulo, and Models 1 of London.

References

External links

1988 births
Living people
People from Belo Horizonte
Brazilian people of Italian descent
Brazilian female models
IMG Models models